Plauditus is a genus of small minnow mayflies in the family Baetidae. There are about 10 described species in Plauditus.

Species
These 10 species belong to the genus Plauditus:
 Plauditus bimaculatus (Berner, 1946)
 Plauditus cestus (Provonsha & McCafferty, 1982)
 Plauditus cingulatus (McDunnough, 1931)
 Plauditus dubius (Walsh, 1862)
 Plauditus elliotti (Daggy, 1945)
 Plauditus gloveri (McCafferty & Waltz, 1998)
 Plauditus punctiventris (McDunnough, 1923)
 Plauditus texanus (Wiersema, 1999)
 Plauditus veteris (McDunnough, 1924)
 Plauditus virilis (McDunnough, 1923)

References

Further reading

 
 

Mayflies
Articles created by Qbugbot